Baker Farm, also known as Perdue Farm, is a historic home and farm complex located near Bunn, Franklin County, North Carolina.  The house was built in the first quarter of the 19th century and renovated in 1856 in the Greek Revival style.  It is a two-story, three bay frame dwelling with a late-19th century two-story rear wing.  Also on the property are 10 contributing outbuildings including a smokehouse, wash house, two barns, a storage shed, and three tobacco barns.

It was listed on the National Register of Historic Places in 1982.

References

Houses on the National Register of Historic Places in North Carolina
Houses completed in 1856
Greek Revival houses in North Carolina
Houses in Franklin County, North Carolina
National Register of Historic Places in Franklin County, North Carolina